Shahrak-e Emam Hoseyn may refer to:
 Shahrak-e Emam Hoseyn, Chaharmahal and Bakhtiari
 Shahrak-e Emam Hoseyn, Khuzestan